2014 European Sevens Championship Division A is a lower division European Championships, that was held in Kaunas, Lithuania between 14 June and 15 June 2014. The winner of the division will get promoted to elite championships.

Results

Group A

Group B

Group C

Final standings

Lithuania got promoted to 2015 Sevens Grand Prix Series.

References

Rugby Europe Sevens
Sevens Grand Prix Series
European Sevens
Europe
Sevens